Frances Fuller (March 16, 1907 in Charleston, South Carolina – December 18, 1980 Manhattan, New York City) was an American actress. She is the grandmother of the actress Rachel Miner and the niece of the Supreme Court Justice and Secretary of State James Francis Byrnes (former Governor of South Carolina).

Fuller graduated from the American Academy of Dramatic Arts in New York City in 1928, and was a director and president there from 1954 to 1965. Her film career began with One Sunday Afternoon (1933).

Fuller's Broadway credits include The Lady of the Camellias (1963), Home Is the Hero (1954), Excursion (1937), Stage Door (1936), Her Master's Voice (1933), I Loved You Wednesday (1932), The Animal Kingdom (1932), Five Star Final (1930), Cafe (1930), and The Front Page (1928).

On television, Fuller was a member of the cast of Flame In The Wind, a soap opera on ABC in the mid-1960s.

Fuller was married to producer Worthington Miner, with whom she had three children, and appeared in many productions on Broadway during the 1930s.

Filmography

References

External links

American film actresses
American television actresses
Actresses from Charleston, South Carolina
1907 births
1980 deaths
American Academy of Dramatic Arts alumni
20th-century American actresses